Bashir Ramzy (born 4 May 1979 in Las Cruces, New Mexico) is a male American long jumper.
 
He won the bronze medal at the 2007 Pan American Games. He also competed at the 2006 World Indoor Championships without reaching the final. His personal best jump is 8.18 meters, achieved in April 2009 in Chula Vista.

Bashir was inducted into the Texas A&M Hall of Fame 19 September 2009. He currently coaches at the Chula Vista Elite Athlete Center.

References

https://web.archive.org/web/20130720045407/http://www.aggieathletics.com/ViewArticle.dbml?DB_OEM_ID=27300

All-American (i) 1600 Relay– 2000

All-American (o) 1600 Relay – 2000

All-American (i) Triple Jump – 2001

All-American (o) Long Jump – 2001

All-American 110 Hurdles – 2001

Big 12 Champion, 400m relay – 2001

Big 12 Champion, Triple Jump – 2000

Big 12 Champion, 110 Hurdles – 2000

Big 12 Champion, 110 Hurdles – 2001

Big 12 Champion, Triple Jump – 2001

1979 births
Living people
American male long jumpers
Athletes (track and field) at the 2007 Pan American Games
Pan American Games medalists in athletics (track and field)
Pan American Games bronze medalists for the United States
Medalists at the 2007 Pan American Games